19th CDG Awards
February 21, 2017

Contemporary: 
La La Land

Fantasy: 
Doctor Strange

Period: 
Hidden Figures
The 19th Costume Designers Guild Awards, honoring the best costume designs in film and television for 2016, took place on February 21, 2017. The nominees were announced on January 12, 2017.

Winners and nominees

Film

Excellence in Contemporary Film
 Winner - La La Land - Mary Zophres
 Absolutely Fabulous: The Movie - Rebecca Hale
 Captain Fantastic - Courtney Hoffman
 Lion - Cappi Ireland
 Nocturnal Animals - Arianne Phillips

Excellence in Fantasy Film
 Winner - Doctor Strange - Alexandra Byrne Fantastic Beasts and Where to Find Them - Colleen Atwood
 Kubo and the Two Strings - Deborah Cook
 Miss Peregrine's Home for Peculiar Children - Colleen Atwood
 Rogue One: A Star Wars Story - David Crossman, Glyn Dillon

Excellence in Period Film
 Winner - Hidden Figures - Renee Ehrlich Kalfus The Dressmaker - Marion Boyce, Margot Wilson
 Florence Foster Jenkins - Consolata Boyle
 Hail, Caesar! - Mary Zophres
 Jackie - Madeline Fontaine

Television

Outstanding Contemporary Television Series
 Winner - American Horror Story: Roanoke - Lou Eyrich, Helen Huang Empire - Paolo Nieddu
 Grace and Frankie - Allyson B. Fanger
 House of Cards - Johanna Argan, Kemal Harris
 Transparent - Marie Schley

Outstanding Fantasy Television Series
 Winner - Game of Thrones - Michele Clapton, April Ferry The Man in the High Castle - J.R. Hawbaker
 Once Upon a Time - Eduardo Castro
 Sleepy Hollow - Mairi Chisholm
 The Walking Dead - Eulyn C. Womble

Outstanding Period Television Series
 Winner - The Crown'' - Michele Clapton
 Penny Dreadful - Gabriella Pescucci
 Stranger Things - Kimberly Adams, Malgosia Turzanska
 Westworld - Ane Crabtree
 Westworld'', "The Original" - Trish Summerville

Short Film

Excellence in Short Form Design

 Winner - Pepsi: "Momotarō" feat. Jude Law – Ami Goodheart
 Beyoncé: "Hold Up" – B. Åkerlund
 Dos Equis: "The Most Interesting Man in the World – Mission to Mars" – Julie Vogel
 Dos Equis: "The New Most Interesting Man in the World Traverses the Sand and the Serengeti" – Liz Botes
 H&M: "Come Together" feat. Adrien Brody, directed by Wes Anderson – Milena Canonero

References

Costume Designers Guild Awards
2017 film awards
2017 television awards
2016 guild awards
2016 in fashion
2016 in American cinema
2016 in American television